An officer of the deck (OOD) underway is a watchstanding duty officer on a surface ship in the United States Navy, United States Coast Guard, and NOAA Commissioned Officer Corps who is tasked with certain duties and responsibilities for the ship. The officer of the deck is either subordinate to the command duty officer or, in the absence of one, reports directly to the ship's commanding officer and executive officer, in the latter case holding responsibility for the ship altogether. This article describes duties and responsibilities for an underway OOD for surface ships only.

Overview
In port, the OOD is stationed on the quarterdeck, which is the entry point to the ship. All personnel and visitors must cross the quarterdeck to enter the ship. It is a ceremonial space, representing the ship to visitors. In addition, the OOD has a qualified petty officer manning the gangplank, called the petty officer of the watch (POOW). The POOW is in the position of managing who comes and goes, as well as security. On larger ships there may be as many as three gangplanks in use at once.

At sea, the officer of the deck is stationed on the bridge and is in charge of navigation and safety of the ship, unless relieved by the captain or a senior qualified line officer.  The officer of the deck is assisted by the junior officer of the deck, who is in the process of qualifying as full officer of the deck, and the conning officer, who is also training to become an OOD, but is directly responsible for the maneuvering of the ship. The officer of the deck is also assisted by a boatswain's mate of the watch (BMOW), quartermaster of the watch (QMOW), and signalman of the watch (SMOW).

Responsibilities under way
The following is a list of the OOD's primary duties as prescribed by the Standard Organization and Regulations of the United States Navy, OPNAVINST 3120.32

Keep continually informed concerning the tactical situation and geographic factors that may affect safe navigation of the ship, and take appropriate action to avoid the danger of grounding or collision according to tactical doctrine, the Rules of the Road, and the orders of the commanding officer or other proper authority.
Keep informed concerning current operation plans and orders, intentions of the officer in tactical command and the commanding officer, and such other matters as may pertain to ship or force operations.
Issue necessary orders to the helm and main engine control to avoid danger, to take or keep an assigned station, or to change the course and speed of the ship according to orders of proper authority.
Make all required reports to the commanding officer. When a command duty officer is specified for the watch, they make the same reports to the command duty officer.
Ensure that required reports to the OOD concerning tests and inspections and the routine reports of patrols, watches, and lifeboat crews are promptly originated and that the bridge watch and lookouts are properly posted and alert.
Supervise and direct the personnel on watch on the bridge, ensure that all required entries are properly made in the ship's deck log, and sign the log at the conclusion of the watch.
Issue orders for rendering honors to passing ships as required by regulations and custom.
Ensure that the executive officer, command duty officer (when assigned), and department heads concerned are kept informed of changes in the tactical situation, operation schedule, the approach of heavy weather, and other circumstances that would require a change in the ships routine or other action on their part.
Keep informed of the status and current capabilities of the engineering plant and keep the engineering officer of the watch advised concerning boiler power requirements and the operational situation so they may operate the engineering plant intelligently.
Carry out the routine of the ship as published in the plan of the day and other ships directives, keeping the executive officer advised of any changes that may be necessary.
Supervise and control the use of the general announcing system; the general, chemical, collision, sonar, and steering casualty alarms; and the whistle according to the orders of the commanding officer, tactical doctrine, and the rules of the road.
Permit no person to go aloft on the masts or stacks or to work over the side except when wind and sea conditions will not expose him or her to danger; and then only when all applicable safety precautions are observed.
Supervise and control all transmissions and acknowledgments on the primary and secondary tactical voice radio circuits, and ensure that proper phraseology and procedures are used in all transmissions.
Supervise and conduct on-the-job training for the junior officer of the watch, the junior officer of the deck, and enlisted personnel of the bridge watch.
Assume such other responsibilities as may be assigned by the commanding officer.
Supervise the striking of the ship's bell to denote the hours and half-hours from reveille to taps, requesting permission of the commanding officer to strike eight bells at the hours of 0800, 1200, and 2000.
On ships that do not station a damage control watch officer, supervise the maintenance of a log of all fittings that are in violation of the material condition of readiness prescribed. Entries will show the name and rate of the person requesting permission to open a fitting, approximate length of time to be open, and time closed. Anyone who, without permission, violates the material condition of readiness in effect shall be made the subject of an official report.

Relieving the OOD
There is also a very formal method for relieving the officer of the deck.

Assume that Lieutenant Smith is the officer of the deck and Lieutenant Doe is his replacement.  Lieutenant Doe will check into the Combat Information Center (CIC) to determine any necessary actions that will be expected to occur during the watch, check the navigational track, read any orders, and determine the position of all nearby ships. After this is complete, Lieutenant Doe will state to Lieutenant Smith, "I am ready to relieve you, sir." Lieutenant Smith states, "I am ready to be relieved." He will then brief Lieutenant Doe on any additional information that the replacement should be made aware of, reconfirming the information that Lieutenant Doe has previously gained on his own. When Lieutenant Doe is fully satisfied, he then states, "I relieve you, sir." Lieutenant Smith then states, "I stand relieved. Attention in the pilot house (or bridge), Lieutenant Doe has the deck." An exchange of hand salutes would also be appropriate, depending on the ship. Lieutenant Doe would then announce, "This is Lieutenant Doe, I have the deck." (The use of the term sir in the manner indicated occurs without regard to the actual ranks held by the officers.)

The conning officer will assume the conn, (i.e., control of the engines and rudder) in a similar manner by stating loudly in the pilothouse that they have the conn. This is to ensure that the helmsman and lee helmsman are always aware of who will be giving them rudder and speed orders. The deck and or the conn may be assumed by the captain, simply by announcing the fact or by issuing an order to the helmsman or lee helmsman. For example, the captain may state, "I have the deck and the conn," or "I have the conn," or "Right full rudder, all ahead flank."  In the latter case, the conning officer in the pilot house (or bridge) will announce, "The captain has the conn."  The conn may also be passed to someone else, for a particular purpose.  While the captain may assume the conn, the officer of the deck may order the conning officer to pass him the conn, "Ensign Pulver, pass me the conn." Ensign Pulver will then state, "This is Ensign Pulver, Lieutenant Doe has the deck and the conn."  Lieutenant Doe then announces, "This is Lieutenant Doe, I have the deck and the conn."  In an emergency, the officer of the deck can, if he so chooses, assume the conn by announcing, for example, "This is Lieutenant Doe, I have the conn. Hard right rudder, all engines ahead flank."  However, in most ships, during normal underway operations, it is generally considered "poor form" to request the CONN to pass the conn, as a good OOD would be expected to direct the CONN without the necessity of assuming the conn himself.  Thus, the distinction between having the "deck" and having the "conn" remains.

These changes in status are marked down in the ship's log.

See also

 Navigation
 Passage planning
 Nautical chart
 Nautical publications
 Navy boat crew

References

Nautical terminology
Marine occupations
Titles
United States Navy